Kwon Young-ho (born July 31, 1992) is a South Korean football player. He plays for Ansan Greeners.

Career
Kwon Young-ho joined J3 League club Fujieda MYFC in 2017.

References

External links
 
 

1992 births
Living people
South Korean footballers
J3 League players
K League 2 players
Gwangju FC players
Goyang Zaicro FC players
Fujieda MYFC players
Daejeon Hana Citizen FC players
Association football defenders